The Shire of Campaspe is a local government area in Victoria, Australia, located in the northern part of the state.

It includes the towns of Girgarre, Echuca, Kyabram, Rochester, Tongala and Rushworth. It was formed in 1995 from the amalgamation of the City of Echuca, Shire of Deakin, Shire of Rochester, Shire of Waranga, Town of Kyabram and part of the Shire of Rodney.

The Shire is governed and administered by the Campaspe Shire Council; its seat of local government and administrative centre is located at the council headquarters in Echuca, it also has service centres located in Kyabram, Rochester, Rushworth and Tongala. The Shire is named after the Campaspe River, a major geographical feature that meanders through the LGA.

Council

Current composition
The council is composed of five wards and nine councillors, with three councillors per ward elected to represent each of the Echuca and Kyabram-Deakin wards, and one councillor per remaining ward elected to represent each of the other wards.

Administration and governance
The council meets in the council chambers at the council headquarters in the Echuca Municipal Offices, which is also the location of the council's administrative activities. It also provides customer services at both its administrative centre in Echuca, and its service centres in Kyabram, Rochester, Rushworth and Tongala.

Sister cities 
  Shiroi, Chiba, Japan
  Lequidoe, Aileu Municipality, East Timor
  Shangri-La County, Yunnan Province, China

Townships and localities
The 2021 census, the shire had a population of 38,735 up from 37,061 in the 2016 census

^ - Territory divided with another LGA
* - Not noted in 2016 Census
# - Not noted in 2021 Census

References

External links
Official website
Metlink local public transport map
Link to Land Victoria interactive maps

Local government areas of Victoria (Australia)
Loddon Mallee (region)
 
North Central Victoria